Lauer Flats are 1887 residential townhouses designed by Henry and Charles Lauer in Italianate style, located in Saint Paul, Minnesota, United States. They are listed on the National Register of Historic Places.

References

Houses completed in 1887
National Register of Historic Places in Saint Paul, Minnesota
Residential buildings on the National Register of Historic Places in Minnesota
Italianate architecture in Minnesota
Residential buildings in Saint Paul, Minnesota